Desmodium canadense is a species of flowering plant in the legume family, Fabaceae. It is native to eastern North America. Its common names include showy tick-trefoil, Canadian tick-trefoil, and Canada tickclover.

The plant is a perennial herb and grows in woods, prairies, and disturbed habitat, such as roadsides. It is cultivated as an ornamental plant. It is a larval host plant for butterflies such as the eastern tailed-blue, silver-spotted skipper, and hoary edge. The plant attracts butterflies and hummingbirds. Flowers are pea-shaped, pink to purple in color, and bloom between July to September.

References

External links
Showy Tick-trefoil, Desmodium canadense. Connecticut Botanical Society. 2005.
Desmodium canadense. USDA PLANTS.

canadense
Flora of Ontario
Flora of Canada
Flora of the United States
Plants described in 1753
Taxa named by Carl Linnaeus